Concord Law School (formerly Concord University School of Law), is an online law school based in Los Angeles, California. It is currently known as Concord Law School at Purdue University Global and is one of several schools within Purdue University Global. Established in 1998, Concord Law School was the United States' first fully online law school. The school is accredited by the State Bar of California, but it is not accredited by the American Bar Association.

History
In October 1998, 33 students began the online program. As part of the revolving door between the ABA and start up law schools, Concord hired Barry Currier from 2004 to 2010 as Dean of the law school. The merger of Concord into Kaplan University in late 2007 made Concord the first online law school to be part of a regionally accredited university. As the first fully online law school in the United States, the concept of Concord initially drew criticism from the legal establishment, including U.S. Supreme Court Justice Ruth Bader Ginsburg. In June 2016, Martin Pritikin joined Concord Law School as its dean. In March 2018, Purdue University bought Kaplan University to make a nonprofit institution and a new online university called Purdue University Global. The for-profit Kaplan Higher Education still has a 30-year contract to serve Purdue Global. Enrollment at Concord Law School declined 65 percent between 2014 and 2020.

Mission
Concord Law School's mission is to make "high quality legal education accessible" to students whose life circumstances "preclude attending a traditional campus-based law school."

Student body
As of September 2020, Concord had 374 students: 219 JD students in the bar qualifying program and 155 students in the non-qualifying Executive JD program. According to the California Committee of Bar Examiners, Concord has "'significant attrition with voluntary withdrawals' of up to 45% and involuntary dismissals of up to 35% in the first semester."

Accreditation status
In August 2020, it received programmatic accreditation by the Committee of Bar Examiners of the State Bar of California. As a result, graduates of Concord Law School are eligible for licensure to practice law in two states (Wisconsin and North Carolina) immediately upon receiving their law license in California. However, for 19 other U.S jurisdictions, Concord graduates are eligible for practice after a certain number of years of licensed practice has been reached. Yet, in 31 other jurisdictions a Concord graduate is not typically eligible for licensure. Some states (Georgia, Iowa, Maryland, Michigan, and Texas) will allow a Concord graduate to be licensed under limited circumstances. Purdue Global itself is accredited by Higher Learning Commission.

Bar pass rate
Concord's pass rate for the February 2021 sitting of the California bar exam was 42% for first-time takers and 17% for repeat takers, compared to overall pass rates of 53% and 27% respectively.

Rankings
Concord is not ranked by the U.S. News & World Report. The school is also not listed in the Law School Transparency website that serves "to make entry to the legal profession more transparent, affordable, and fair." However, Concord is listed as one of the "Best Online J.D. Program(s)" according to the Princeton Review.

Gainful employment
Of the 160 schools that reported their gainful employment numbers, Concord Law School is too small to have its gainful employment rate (GEE) published by the Texas Public Policy Foundation. However, according to Concord's own survey, 53% of graduates had gainful employment where a Juris Doctor degree was required.

Although salary data have not been published for Concord Law School, another online law school (Taft Law School) was found by the Wall Street Journal to have an acceptable return on investment wherein the income gained from earning the degree exceeded the student debt used to finance it.

Faculty 
The Concord Law School lists 19 faculty: four deans, six professors, and nine adjuncts. The California Committee of Bar Examiners states that as of September 2019, the faculty included seven full-time professors and 24 adjunct professors.

Degrees offered
Concord offers two law degrees: the Juris Doctor (JD) degree and the Executive Juris Doctor (EJD) degree. Recipients of the JD degree who pass the California Bar Examination and otherwise meet the California State Bar requirements are admitted to the bar and can practice law in California. California bar licensees may practice in most federal courts outside of California and may work as in-house counsel in out-of-state corporations, among other roles.

The JD program is a 92-unit, four-year program. Students are required to complete at least 22-24 units of coursework between 48 and 52 consecutive weeks each year. Graduates of this program meet the legal education requirement of the Committee of Bar Examiners of the State Bar of California and may apply for admission to the State Bar of California.

The EJD is a 72-unit, three-year program. Recipients of this degree are not eligible to take the bar examination. The degree stirred controversy, with Buzzfeed News reporting that students were misled into thinking the degree would allow them to practice as attorneys. Higher education experts raised concerns about the value of the degree, saying it was misleading for students.

Employment

In November 2008, Ross Mitchell, a 2004 Concord JD graduate who had been admitted to the California bar, won a lawsuit to take the Massachusetts bar exam, which is normally only open to graduates of ABA-accredited law schools. The court ruled on equitable grounds, noting that under the ABA standards it would have been impossible for Concord to have received accreditation, regardless of the quality of its educational offerings, because of its entirely online instruction.

References

External links
 

Educational institutions established in 1998
Distance education institutions based in the United States
Law schools in California
1998 establishments in California
Private universities and colleges in California
Universities and colleges in Los Angeles
Purdue University
1988 establishments in California
Online law schools in the United States